Scissurellidae, sometimes known by the common name little slit snails, are a taxonomic family of minute sea snails, marine gastropod molluscs or micromolluscs in the clade Vetigastropoda (according to the taxonomy of the Gastropoda by Bouchet & Rocroi, 2005).

The shells of these snails vary in adult size from less than 6 mm to less than 1 mm.

Distribution
Scissurellids occur world-wide, from the intertidal zone down to the abyssal depths, including around hydrothermal vents.

Taxonomy
There are about 169 living described species of Scissurellidae, but the diversity of scissurellids is still far from being completely assessed (approximately 60 collected species await description). The monophyly of the family is questionable.

In 2003, there were about twenty-five genera divided into five subfamilies (Scissurellinae, Anatominae, Sutilizoninae, Temnocinclinae, Larocheinae) . Three of these subfamilies were later updated to family level.

According to the taxonomy of the Gastropoda by Bouchet & Rocroi, 2005), this family consisted of the two following subfamilies :
 Scissurellinae Gray, 1847 - synonym: Depressizoninae Geiger, 2003; now accepted with family rank Scissurellidae.
 Larocheinae Finlay, 1927: now elevated to family rank as Larocheidae.

However Geiger (2009) elevated Depressizoninae to the family rank as Depressizonidae.

Genera 
Genera in the family Scissurellidae include:
 Coronadoa Bartsch, 1915
 Incisura Hedley, 1904
 Satondella Bandel, 1998
 Scissurella d'Orbigny, 1824
 Sinezona Finlay, 1927
 Sukashitrochus Habe & Kosuge, 1964
 Triassurella  A. Nützel and D. L. Geiger. 2006 

Genera brought into synonymy
 Ariella Bandel, 1998: synonym of Sinezona Finlay, 1926
 Daizona Bandel, 1998: synonym of Sinezona Finlay, 1926
 Maxwellella Bandel, 1998: synonym of Scissurella d'Orbigny, 1824
 † Praescissurella Lozouet, 1998: synonym of Scissurella d'Orbigny, 1824
 † Reussella Bandel, 1998: synonym of Scissurella d'Orbigny, 1824
 Schismope Jeffreys, 1856: synonym of Scissurella d'Orbigny, 1824
 Scissurona Iredale, 1824: synonym of Incisura Hedley, 1904
 Temnocinclis - in its own family Sutilizonidae
 Temnozaga  - in its own family Sutilizonidae
 Woodwardia Crosse & P. Fischer, 1861: synonym of Scissurella d'Orbigny, 1824

References

 Geiger D.L. (2003). Phylogenetic assessment of characters proposed for the generic classification of Recent Scissurellidae (Gastropoda: Vetigastropoda) with a description of one new genus and six new species frop Easter Island and Australia. Molluscan Research 23:21-83
 Geiger D.L. (2012) Monograph of the little slit shells. Volume 1. Introduction, Scissurellidae. pp. 1-728. Volume 2. Anatomidae, Larocheidae, Depressizonidae, Sutilizonidae, Temnocinclidae. pp. 729–1291. Santa Barbara Museum of Natural History Monographs Number 7.

Further reading 
 
 Marshall B. A. (2002). "Some recent scissurellids from the New Zealand region and remarks on some scissurellid genus group names (Mollusca : Gastropoda : Vetigastropoda)". Molluscan Research 22(2): 165–181. , PDF.
 Zelaya D. G. & Geiger D. L. (2007). "Species Of Scissurellidae and Anatomidae From Sub-Antarctic and Antarctic Waters (Gastropoda: Vetigastropoda)". Malacologia 49(2): 393–443.

External links
 Natural History Museum Rotterdam page of images of this family

 
Taxa named by John Edward Gray